Milanlu-ye Olya (also Romanized as Mīlānlū-ye ‘Olyā; also known as Mīlānlū-ye Bālā, Mīlānlū Bālā, and Milānlu yi Bāla) is a village in Jirestan Rural District, Sarhad District, Shirvan County, North Khorasan Province, Iran. At the 2006 census, its population was 377, in 88 families.

References 

Populated places in Shirvan County